Okahukura railway station was a station on the North Island Main Trunk in New Zealand.

The station opened when work started on the eastern end of the Stratford–Okahukura Line. The Public Works Department operated a limited train service as far as Matiere from 1922. A junction with the NIMT at Ongarue, and even as far north as Puketutu (via Mokauiti and Ohura) had been considered before the Okahukura route was decided in 1911. Work started shortly after Sir Joseph Ward had turned the first sod, including the construction of workshops and 4 railway houses at Okahukura, and the station opened the following year. It seems that the initial service was provided by coaches attached to goods trains.

A cattle yard and goods shed were added in 1915. In 1916 a porter was paid 9 shillings a week.

Patronage 

Passenger numbers peaked in 1934, as shown in the graph and table below -

Road-rail bridge 
The concrete foundations of the  road-rail bridge over the Ongarue River, on the Stratford line had been laid by 1918, but war-time steel shortages delayed further work. The first piles were sunk in 1916 and it had been completed by January 1922.

In 2019 reopening of the line was listed as a possible future priority.

Okahukura tunnel 
 long Okahukura tunnel, is  up from Okahukura, along the Stratford line, on a 1 in 50 gradient. It was started in February 1914 and completed in December 1920, after digging out  of mudstone.

References

External links 
Photo of road-rail double deck bridge about 1930

Ruapehu District
Defunct railway stations in New Zealand
Buildings and structures in Manawatū-Whanganui
Rail transport in Manawatū-Whanganui
Railway stations opened in 1912 
Railway stations closed in 1978